This article contains information about the literary events and publications of 1663.

Events
February 
The Académie des inscriptions et belles-lettres (Academy of the Humanities) is founded in Paris.
Katherine Philips' translation of Pierre Corneille's Pompée is produced successfully at the Theatre Royal, Dublin (Smock Alley Theatre) in Ireland, as the first rhymed version of a French tragedy in English and the first English play written by a woman to be performed on a professional stage. It is published in Dublin and London later in the year.
London printer John Twyn is hanged, drawn and quartered at Tyburn for producing the anonymous A Treatise of the Execution of Justice, justifying civil rebellion.
February 24 – John Milton marries his third wife, Elizabeth Minshull, 31 years his junior, at St Mary Aldermary in the City of London.
May 7 – The King's Company inaugurates its new theatre, the first Theatre Royal, Drury Lane, London, with a revival of Fletcher's The Humorous Lieutenant. The play succeeds and runs for twelve nights in a row, unusual under the repertory system of the time.
August – The Playhouse to Be Let, an anthology of work by Sir William Davenant, is performed at Lincoln's Inn Fields in London.
December 1 – John Dryden marries Elizabeth, sister of Sir Robert Howard. Dryden and John Aubrey become Fellows of the Royal Society in the same year.
unknown dates
In the Electorate of Bavaria, a legal deposit law requires copies of all newly printed books to be deposited in the Bavarian State Library in Munich.
In England, Roger L'Estrange is appointed Surveyor of the Imprimery and Printing Presses and licenser of the press.
The Third Folio of Shakespeare's plays is published by Philip Chetwinde in London, adding Pericles and six plays of Shakespeare Apocrypha to the canon.
Publication takes place at Cambridge in the Massachusetts Bay Colony of the "Eliot Indian Bible" (Mamusse Wunneetupanatamwe Up-Biblum God) makes it the first complete Bible published in the Americas. The translation by the English-born Puritan missionary John Eliot of the Geneva Bible from English into the Massachusett language (Natic or Wômpanâak) variety of the Algonquian languages is printed by Samuel Green.

New books

Prose
Molière – 
John Spencer –

Drama
Anonymous – The Wandering Whores' Complaint for Want of Trading (published)
Miguel de Barrios – 
Roger Boyle, 1st Earl of Orrery – The General
George Villiers, Duke of Buckingham (after Jonson) – Sir Politic Would-Be
 Pedro Calderón de la Barca 
 
 
Henry Cary – The Marriage Night
Abraham Cowley – The Cutter of Coleman Street
William Davenant
The Playhouse to Be Let (performed)
The Siege of Rhodes Part 2 (published)
John Dryden – The Wild Gallant
Andreas Gryphius
, 
Papinianus
Edward Howard – The Usurper (first performance; published 1667)
James Howard – The English Monsieur
Sir Robert Howard – The Committee
"T. P." – A Witty Combat, or the Female Victor (once attributed to Thomas Porter)
Thomas Porter – The Villain
Richard Rhodes – Flora's Vagaries
Sir Robert Stapylton
The Stepmother
The Slighted Maid
 Sir Samuel Tuke – The Adventures of Five Hours (adapted from Antonio Coello's )

Poetry
Abraham Cowley – Verses Upon Several Occasions
Sir William Davenant – Poem, to the King’s most sacred Majesty

Births
February 12 – Cotton Mather, New England Puritan author and minister (died 1728)
March 6 – Francis Atterbury, English man of letters and bishop (died 1732
March 22 – August Hermann Francke, German theologian (died 1727)
May 20 – William Bradford, American printer (died 1752)
 Unknown dates
William King, English poet (died 1712)
George Stepney, English poet (died 1707)
 Probable year of birth – Delarivier Manley, English novelist, playwright and pamphleteer (died 1724)

Deaths
April 5 – John Norton, English religious writer (born 1606)
April 17 – David Questiers, Dutch poet (born 1623)
July 14 – Elizabeth Egerton, countess of Bridgwater, English essayist (childbirth, born 1626)
October 31 – Théophile Raynaud, French theologian (born 1583)
December 5 – Severo Bonini, Italian music writer (born 1582)
Unknown date – Claude de Bourdeille, comte de Montrésor, French memoirist (born c. 1606)

References

 
Years of the 17th century in literature